"The Wall Around the World" is a science fiction short story by American writer Theodore Cogswell. It was first published in the magazine Beyond Fantasy Fiction in 1953 and provided the title for Cogswell's first short fiction collection, published in 1962. It is set in a world where magic is taken for granted and technology is banned.

Plot summary
13-year-old Porgie Mills, an orphan raised by his aunt and uncle, is fascinated by the impassable "wall around the world". It is a barrier higher than any broomstick can fly. His obsession distracts him from his schoolwork in magic. No amount of discipline can diminish the boy's interest. His schoolteacher, Mr Wickens, warns Porgie not to follow in the footsteps of his father, who dabbled in forbidden technology until the dreaded "Black Man" took him away. Porgie, inspired by a sketch by his father, builds a crude glider in secret.

On his 14th birthday, Porgie launches his contraption. He uses his broomstick for additional lift. While aloft, Porgie spots his bullying cousin "Bull Pup" flying below and takes the opportunity to taunt him. An aerial fight ensues and Porgie's glider gets damaged.

Porgie now sets his sights on the Wall. His broomstick stops working, but Porgie pilots his glider upward until he reaches the wall's top, just before his glider breaks up. Atop the wall, he sees the Black Man flying toward him. He panics and falls off the Wall. He is caught by the Black Man, who reveals himself as Wickens. The schoolteacher tells Porgie the truth: the world outside Porgie's home town is based on technology and lacking in magic. The Wall was built, and people put inside it, in order to develop their psychic abilities. Wickens takes Porgie to be reunited with his father.

1953 short stories
Science fiction short stories
Works originally published in Beyond Fantasy Fiction